The SAAF School Cricket Series is an annual high school cricket championship organized by the Student Athletic Activities Foundation in Nepal. It is played under the Twenty20 variant of limited overs cricket.

History
The inaugural event of the SAAF School Cricket Series was staged in Kathmandu from 31 December 2014 to 7 January 2015 with eight high school cricket teams from seven high schools.  The event was titled WAI WAI School Cricket Series 2014 after the main sponsor of the championship.  Out of the 20 matches, 16 were played at Sainik Awasiya Mahavidyalaya Ground, Bhaktapur and 4 were played at Engineering Campus Ground, Lalitpur.

Format
Eight teams are divided into two, four-team, pools.  Each pool plays a round-robin format.  The top two teams from each pool compete in the first place playoffs to determine the teams finishing in the top four positions.  The bottom two teams from each pool are relegated to the fifth place playoffs.

Teams

Championship Titles

Statistics

References

External links
  Championship Statistics & Results on CricHQ

Nepalese domestic cricket competitions
2014 in cricket
High school cricket
2014 establishments in Nepal